Daniel Ilsley (May 30, 1740 – May 10, 1813) was a U.S. Representative from Massachusetts.

Born in Falmouth in Massachusetts Bay's Province of Maine, Ilsley received a liberal schooling. He became a distiller and was also interested in shipping. He served as a member of the committee of correspondence and safety.
Major and mustering officer at Falmouth, during the Revolutionary War. He served as a delegate to the Massachusetts State convention in 1788 that adopted the Federal Constitution.
He served as a member of the Massachusetts House of Representatives in 1793 and 1794.

Ilsley was elected as a Democratic-Republican to the Tenth Congress (March 4, 1807 – March 3, 1809).
He was an unsuccessful candidate for reelection in 1808 to the Eleventh Congress.
He died in Portland in Massachusetts' District of Maine on May 10, 1813.
He was interred in the Eastern Cemetery in Portland.

Sources

1740 births
1813 deaths
Continental Army staff officers
Massachusetts Democratic-Republicans
Politicians from Portland, Maine
Burials at Eastern Cemetery
Democratic-Republican Party members of the United States House of Representatives from the District of Maine
People of colonial Maine
Members of the United States House of Representatives from Massachusetts